Gilles-Joseph-Martin Bruneteau Saint-Suzanne (7 March 1760 – 26 August 1830) was a French Revolutionary and Napoleonic general. A Grand Officer of the Legion of Honour, he was made a Count under the First French Empire. His name is inscribed "S SUZANNE" on the east pillar of the Arc de Triomphe.

Notes

References

1760 births
1830 deaths
Grand Officiers of the Légion d'honneur
Names inscribed under the Arc de Triomphe
French generals
French Republican military leaders of the French Revolutionary Wars
French military personnel of the French Revolutionary Wars
French military personnel of the Napoleonic Wars
Military leaders of the French Revolutionary Wars
People from Aube